"Roll Up Your Sleeves" is a song recorded by Australian singer Meg Mac for her extended play, MegMac. The song was released for digital download on 1 July 2014. "Roll Up Your Sleeves" gave Mac her first ARIA Charts entry, peaking at number 80. The song was voted in at number 24 on the Triple J Hottest 100, 2014.

In an interview with Rolling Stone Australia, Mac described the song saying; “I feel like I wrote this song from myself to myself as some sort of reminder. Doing the right thing is hard and sometimes it is way easier to pretend you don't give a shit. Deep down I think we all give a shit and that everything has to be alright if you want it to be. I do really believe that.” 

Meg also said it is the quickest song she has ever written.

The song placed second in the 2014 Vanda & Young Global Songwriting Competition.

Reviews
The track has been described as “a dark soul ballad enriched by a warm, breathy refrain, the piano-led single stands in radiant contrast to the grit of powerhouse stomper, “Every Lie””

In a review on Triple J, it was described as “punchy and empowering".

Nastassia Baroni of Music Feeds said; “This new single follows up tracks "Known Better" and "Every Lie" and it's laced with as much bluesy soul as its predecessors. Led by a simple driving piano, [Mac's] powerful and soaring vocals demand all the attention.” 

Zara Golden from The Fader described the song as “a folky, infectious just-do-you anthem.”

Music video
The black and white music video for “Roll Up Your Sleeves” was directed by Tobias Andersson and released on 14 July 2014.

Charts

Weekly charts

Covers
Urthboy (featuring Hermitude, All Our Exes Live in Texas, Tom Thum and Kira Puru) covered the song in December 2015 as part of Triple J’s ‘Like a Version’.

References

2014 songs
2014 singles
Meg Mac songs